The women's high jump event  at the 1988 European Athletics Indoor Championships was held on 6 March.

Results

References

High jump at the European Athletics Indoor Championships
High
Euro